MD Productions is a Pakistani television and film production company based in Karachi, Pakistan. It is founded by Momina Duraid and Duraid Qureshi, son of Sultana Siddiqui.

History
The company has produced television serials such as Zindagi Gulzar Hai, Dastaan and Sadqay Tumhare. MD Productions produced its first film in 2015 Bin Roye which received positive reviews internationally. Some of their most recent work include Suno Chanda, Dar Si Jaati Hai Sila, O Rangreza, Yaqeen Ka Safar, Diyar e Dil, Hum Thehrey Gunehgaar, Malaal e Yaar, Sanwari, and Jaal.

Current productions
{| class="wikitable sortable plainrowheaders" style="text-align:center"
|-
!Title
!Genre
!First aired
!Last aired
!
|-
|Sang-e-Mah
| Drama
| 9 January 2022
| Present
|
|-
|Bebasi
|Drama
|12 November 2021
|Present
|
|-
|Dobara
|Drama
|20 October 2021
|Present
|
|-
|Ishq E Laa
| Drama
| 21 October 2021
| Present
|
|-
|Aitebaar
|Drama
|24 January 2022
|Present
|
|-
|Ibn-e-Hawwa
|Drama
|8 February 2022
|Present
|
|-
|Badshah Begum
|Drama
|2 March 2022
|Present
|
|-
|Paristan (TV series)|Drama
|3 April 2022
|Present
|
|-
|Hum Tum (2022 TV series)|Drama
|3 April 2022
|Present
|
|}

Former productions
Films
 Bin Roye (2015)
 Verna (2017)
 Parwaaz Hay Junoon (2018)Superstar (2019)Pyaar Kahani'' (2019)

Television

References

 
Film production companies of Pakistan
Television production companies of Pakistan
Companies based in Karachi
Mass media companies established in 2006